Year's Best SF 7 is a science fiction anthology edited by David G. Hartwell and Kathryn Cramer that was published in 2002.  It is the seventh in the Year's Best SF series.

Contents

The book itself, as well as each of the stories, has a short
introduction by the editors.

Nancy Kress: "Computer Virus" (First published in Asimov's, 2001)
Terry Bisson: "Charlie's Angels" (First published in Sci Fiction, 2001)
Richard Chwedyk: "The Measure of All Things" (First published in F&SF, 2000)
Simon Ings: "Russian Vine" (First published in Sci Fiction, 2001)
Michael Swanwick: "Under's Game" (First published in Sci Fiction, 2001)
Brian W. Aldiss: "A Matter of Mathematics" (First published in Supertoys Last All Summer Long, 2001)
Edward M. Lerner: "Creative Destruction" (First published in Analog, 2001)
David Morrell: "Resurrection" (First published in Redshift, 2001)
James Morrow: "The Cat's Pajamas" (First published in F&SF, 2001)
Michael Swanwick: "The Dog Said Bow-Wow" (First published in Asimov's, 2001)
Ursula K. Le Guin: "The Building" (First published in Redshift, 2001)
Stephen Baxter: "Gray Earth" (First published in Asimov's, 2001)
Terry Dowling: "The Lagan Fishers" (First published in Sci Fiction, 2001)
Thomas M. Disch: "In Xanadu" (First published in Redshift, 2001)
Lisa Goldstein: "The Go-Between" (First published in Asimov's, 2001)
Gene Wolfe: "Viewpoint" (First published in Redshift, 2001)
Gregory Benford: "Anomalies" (First published in Redshift, 2001)
Alastair Reynolds: "Glacial" (First published in Spectrum SF, 2001)
James Patrick Kelly: "Undone" (First published in Asimov's, 2001)

External links 

2002 anthologies
Year's Best SF anthology series
Eos Books books
2000s science fiction works